Meli Bendeli  (formerly Ahmet Melih Yılmaz; born 1989) is a Turkish transgender actress.

Biography 
Ahmet Melih Yılmaz was born in 1989 in Ankara. He graduated from Ankara University DTCF Theater Department. He is an experienced theater actor. He was very popular with his acting performance in the theater play Woyzeck Masalı directed by Erdal Beşikçioğlu.

Ahmet Melih Yılmaz, in addition to his theater works, has started to act in films and TV series since 2010. He took part in the series Hatırla Gönül in 2015, and in 2018 he started to portray the character of Timsah Celil in the TV series Çukur, but later left the series. He played the role of Şinasi in the series Cam Tavanlar, which was broadcast on Show TV and made its final in 2021. At the same time, she plays the leading role in Miriam Yasta, staged by Tatbikat Sahne, and directed by Erdal Beşikçioğlu, which premiered on 19 November 2021.

In January 2022, Yılmaz came out as a transgender woman and began using she/her pronouns.

Filmography

Film

Television

Theatre

References

The information in this article is based on that in its Turkish equivalent.

External links
 

Living people
1989 births
21st-century Turkish actors
Turkish television actors
Turkish LGBT actors
Turkish film actors
Turkish LGBT singers
Transgender women
Transgender actresses

tr:Meli Bendeli